Hacettepe University Medical School is a medical school located at Hacettepe University Medical Center in Ankara, Turkey.

History

Hacettepe University Medical School began with the establishment of The Child Health Department affiliated with Ankara University Medical School on February 2, 1954.

Official seal
The emblem of the University was designed in 1967 by Dr. Yücel Tanyeri, then a second year medical student, in the likeness of a stag – the symbol of a Hittite deity discovered at the royal tombs in Alacahöyük. Inspired by this archeological symbol common to the region, the Stag was chosen as the symbol of the University, and was abstracted to represent a lowercase "h" – the first letter of the university's name.

Achievements
On February 24, 2011, Turkish surgeon Dr. Serdar Nasır and his team successfully performed the country’s second full face transplant at the university's hospital in Ankara after almost one month the first transplant of its sort in Turkey. The 25-year-old patient, Cengiz Gül's face was badly burnt in a television tube implosion accident when he was two years old. The donor was 40-year-old N. A. (his family did not allow his identity to be revealed), who experienced brain death two days before the surgery following a motorcycle accident which occurred on February 17.

The surgery team accomplished at the same time another transplant, world's first-ever double-arm and double-leg limb transplant on 25-year old Şevket Çavdar using the organs of the same donor.

Notable people
 Serdar Nasır, Associate Prof. Dr. at Institute of Plastic, Reconstructive and Aesthetic Surgery

References

External links
 Hacettepe University Official Site
 International Students Office
 Hacettepe University EU Office
 Faculty of Medicine
 Hacettepe University Medical School Facebook Page

Hacettepe University
Medical schools in Turkey